Schaller GmbH is a German manufacturer of musical instrument hardware based in Postbauer-Heng near Nuremberg, Bavaria. It designs, produces and sells guitar tuners, bridges, tremolos, strap locks and, other accessories primarily for guitars.
Schaller was founded in Feucht near Nuremberg in 1945 by Helmut Schaller as a radio repair shop. Since then, Schaller has developed into one of the foremost regarded suppliers for the music instrument industry.
Dr. Lars Bünning has been the company's owner since 2009.

History

The Schaller company was founded in 1945 by Helmut Schaller (1923 – 1999). Helmut Schaller was a toolmaker and a radio master mechanic. His radio repair shop prospered in the 1950s. During that time another department was created, dedicated to the development of amplifiers and speakers, which turned out to be so successful that the entire company was restructured and renamed to "Schaller Electronic". Echos and reverb devices were soon added to their portfolio.

By 1953, Schaller had begun manufacturing electronic guitar components such as pickups and switches for Fred Wilfer's guitar company Framus in Bubenreuth, Bavaria.

A couple of years later, other German guitar manufacturers such as Höfner, Hopf and Hoyer also became customers. By the 1960s American guitar makers including Fender, Gibson, C. F. Martin and Ovation started to rely on Schaller products for their guitars and basses.

At the same time Schaller extended its portfolio to tremolos (1961), bridges (1962) and machine heads (1966). The "M6" tuning machine made a mark as the world's first fully enclosed and self-locking precision tuner.

In 1968 Schaller moved about 15 kilometers from Feucht to Postbauer-Heng into a new site. A new production facility was set up in order to meet the rising demand for Schaller products.

The product portfolio was constantly expanded in the 1970s. The "M4" bass tuners, various bridges including the "TOM" bridges for Gibson guitars and numerous other variants of pickups ("Golden 50", "S6", "T6" etc.) were added.

In addition, Schaller was coming up with many product designs on its own. Renowned guitar makers therefore came in touch with Schaller and were convinced to equip their guitars with components by Schaller. In 1977, Floyd D. Rose uttered the idea of a double-locking tremolo system. After a joint workshop (that lasted for about three months) Schaller was able to develop this novel tremolo. The first prototype was produced soon after.

Due to the lack of demand, at the beginning of the 1980s the production of loudspeakers, amplifiers and reverberators was ceased. The core business shifted to metal components for guitars. In 1981 a new product was designed and patented in this respect: the security lock, a part which helps provide a secure connection between guitar and strap. It has been Schaller's most-sold product since then.

The product portfolio steadily expanded during the 1980s and 1990s. This came to a stop after both Helmut Schaller and his son René Schaller died (in 1999 resp. in 1998). Until the late 1990s violin accessories were added to the portfolio as well as cables, and even special spinning machines for strings and ball ends, however the newly introduced products did not achieve the same success as the earlier guitar components.

A vital period for the company was from 1999 until 2006 since a community of heirs ran the company then. Grete Schaller (1926 – 2007), Helmut Schaller's widow, tried to lead the company without being able to generate new impetus, without providing ideas for new products, and without modernizing the production facility at Postbauer-Heng. This led to the company stagnating.

New Schaller
In August 2006, a breakthrough was achieved, when the Schaller company was legally and financially restructured. It was renamed to a limited liability company ("GmbH") by a partnership. Subsequently, Dr. Lars Bünning became managing director of the company by December 2006. In January 2009, Dr. Bünning took over the shares of the GmbH belonging to the Schaller family, and has since then acted as both owner and CEO. Further restructuring occurred after 2007.

Current Schaller products

Machine heads 

 GrandTune Series
 M4 Series
 M6 Series
 F-Series
 Da Vinci
 BM Series
 Lyra
 Hauser

Bridges and tailpieces 

 Signum
 Hannes
 TOM- and 3D-bridges
 STM and GTM Gibson Les Paul replacement bridges, and accompanying tailpiece

Tremolos 

 LockMeister
 Schaller
 Vintage series
 SureClaw spring tensioner

Accessories 

 S-Locks
 "Flagship" preamp
 "Oyster" piezo pickup
 Megaswitches
 Covers and frames for pickups

The production of pickups by Schaller was discontinued in 2017.

The shift towards machine heads and metal hardware resulted in the company being renamed from "Schaller Electronic" to "Schaller GmbH".
All Schaller products are manufactured in the Schaller factory in Postbauer-Heng. Schaller customers are both guitar manufacturers and musicians.

References

External links
 
 Schaller 456 - Review

Companies based in Bavaria
Manufacturing companies established in 1950
Privately held companies of Germany
German luthiers
String instrument construction